Promissão is a municipality in the state of São Paulo, Brazil. The population is 40,828 (2020 est.) in an area of 780 km². Its elevation is 426 m.

References

External links 
  Site Prefeitura Municipal de Promissão
  Site Câmara Municipal de Promissão
  Promissao Non-Official Site

Municipalities in São Paulo (state)